Jessica De Abreu  is a Venezuelan model and beauty pageant titleholder. She represented Apure state in the 2007 Miss Venezuela pageant.

References

Living people
Venezuelan female models
People from Caracas
Year of birth missing (living people)